Canning Creek is a rural locality split between the Goondiwindi Region and the Toowoomba Region in Queensland, Australia.

Geography
The Millmerran–Inglewood Road (State Route 82) passes through the locality from north to south.

Much of the locality is occupied by a large portion of the Bringalily State Forest.

History 
The locality takes its name from the creek name, which in turn was named in 1827 by Allan Cunningham after Sir George Canning, the Prime Minister of Great Britain in 1827.

In 1848, 3 Aboriginal women and one child were murdered in the area by a posse of seven white men.

Canning Creek was opened for selection on 17 April 1877;  were available.

The Canning Creek Provisional School opened on 15 November 1885 and became Canning Creek State School on 1 January 1909. The school closed on a number of occasions due to low student numbers. On 18 April 1922 it became a half-time school sharing the teacher with Glenside State School, with both schools closing on 20 June 1922.

Glenside Provisional School opened in 1914. On 1 December 1914 it became Glenside State School. On 18 April 1922 it was closed as a full-time school and reopened as a half time school in conjunction with Canning Creek State School. Due to the distance between the 2 schools they closed on 20 June 1922.

Education 
There are no schools in the locality. The nearest primary and secondary school is Inglewood State School (Prep to Year 10) in neighbouring Inglewood to the south. There are no nearby secondary schools for education to Year 12; the nearest are Goondiwindi State High School in Goondiwindi and Warwick State High School in Warwick. Distance education and boarding school would be other options.

References 

Goondiwindi Region
Toowoomba Region
Localities in Queensland